Glossopaschia is a monotypic snout moth genus. It was described by Harrison Gray Dyar Jr. in 1914 and contains the species Glossopaschia caenoses. It is found in Panama.

References

Epipaschiinae
Monotypic moth genera
Moths of Central America
Pyralidae genera